Sabina Teichman (1905-1983) was an American painter. Her work is included in the collections of the Whitney Museum of American Art and the Carnegie Museum of Art.

References

1905 births
1983 deaths
20th-century American women artists
20th-century American artists